Kostas Pagonis (born 11 September 1985 in Athens) is a Greek professional footballer, who last played for AEL 1964 FC in the Greek Football League.

Club career 
Pagonis started playing as an amateur for Akratitos F.C. in 2003. After a year playing with the team's youth squad, he was promoted to the first team and became a professional. Since then he has played in many teams mostly in the second and third national division. On 29 June 2012 he signed a one-year contract with AEL 1964 FC.

External links 

AEL 1964 FC Official
Player Announcement

1985 births
Living people
Greece under-21 international footballers
Super League Greece players
Super League Greece 2 players
Athlitiki Enosi Larissa F.C. players
PAS Giannina F.C. players
Atromitos F.C. players
A.P.O. Akratitos Ano Liosia players
Ethnikos Piraeus F.C. players
Panachaiki F.C. players
Thrasyvoulos F.C. players
Association football defenders
Footballers from Athens
Greek footballers